Belu in Iran may refer to:
 Belu, Kurdistan
 Belu, West Azerbaijan